The 2016–17 UEFA Champions League qualifying phase and play-off round began on 28 June and ended on 24 August 2016. A total of 56 teams competed in the qualifying phase and play-off round to decide 10 of the 32 places in the group stage of the 2016–17 UEFA Champions League.

All times are CEST (UTC+2).

Round and draw dates
The schedule of the competition was as follows (all draws were held at the UEFA headquarters in Nyon, Switzerland, unless stated otherwise).

Format
In the qualifying phase and play-off round, each tie was played over two legs, with each team playing one leg at home. The team that scored more goals on aggregate over the two legs advanced to the next round. If the aggregate score was level, the away goals rule would be applied, i.e., the team that scored more goals away from home over the two legs advances. If away goals were also equal, then 30 minutes of extra time would be played, divided into two 15-minute halves. The away goals rule would be again applied after extra time, i.e., if there were goals scored during extra time and the aggregate score was still level, the visiting team advanced by virtue of more away goals scored. If no goals were scored during extra time, the tie would be decided by penalty shoot-out.

In the draws for each round, teams were seeded based on their UEFA club coefficients at the beginning of the season, with the teams divided into seeded and unseeded pots. A seeded team was drawn against an unseeded team, with the order of legs in each tie decided by draw. Due to the limited time between matches, the draws for the second and third qualifying rounds took place before the results of the previous round were known. For these draws (or in any cases where the result of a tie in the previous round was not known at the time of the draw), the seeding was carried out under the assumption that the team with the higher coefficient of an undecided tie advanced to this round, which means if the team with the lower coefficient was to advance, it simply took the seeding of its defeated opponent. Prior to the draws, UEFA may form "groups" in accordance with the principles set by the Club Competitions Committee, but they are purely for convenience of the draw and for ensuring that teams from the same association are not drawn against each other, and do not resemble any real groupings in the sense of the competition.

Teams
There were two routes which the teams were separated into during qualifying:
Champions Route, which included all domestic champions which do not qualify directly for the group stage.
League Route (also called the Non-champions Path or the Best-placed Path), which included all domestic non-champions which did not qualify directly for the group stage.

A total of 56 teams (41 in Champions Route, 15 in League Route) were involved in the qualifying phase and play-off round. The 10 winners of the play-off round (5 in Champions Route, 5 in League Route) advanced to the group stage to join the 22 teams which enter in the group stage. The 15 losers of the third qualifying round entered the Europa League play-off round, and the 10 losers of the play-off round enter the Europa League group stage.

Below are the participating teams (with their 2016 UEFA club coefficients), grouped by their starting rounds.

Champions Route

Notes

League Route

First qualifying round

Seeding
A total of eight teams played in the first qualifying round. The draw was held on 20 June 2016.

Summary
The first legs were played on 28 June, and the second legs were played on 5 and 6 July 2016.

|}

Matches

Lincoln Red Imps won 3–2 on aggregate.

The New Saints won 5–1 on aggregate.

2–2 on aggregate; Valletta won on away goals.

Alashkert won 3–0 on aggregate.

Second qualifying round

Seeding
A total of 34 teams played in the second qualifying round: 30 teams which entered in this round, and the four winners of the first qualifying round. The draw was held on 20 June 2016.

Notes

Summary
The first legs were played on 12 and 13 July, and the second legs were played on 19 and 20 July 2016.

|}

Matches

Qarabağ won 3–1 on aggregate.

Hapoel Be'er Sheva won 3–2 on aggregate.

6–6 on aggregate; Trenčín won on away goals.

Red Bull Salzburg won 3–0 on aggregate.

Dinamo Zagreb won 5–3 on aggregate.

APOEL won 3–0 on aggregate.

Legia Warsaw won 3–1 on aggregate.

Ludogorets Razgrad won 5–0 on aggregate.

Dinamo Tbilisi won 3–1 on aggregate.

Astana won 2–1 on aggregate.

2–2 on aggregate; Partizani won on penalties.

BATE Borisov won 4–2 on aggregate.

Red Star Belgrade won 4–2 on aggregate.

Rosenborg won 5–4 on aggregate.

3–3 on aggregate; Dundalk won on away goals.

Celtic won 3–1 on aggregate.

Copenhagen won 9–0 on aggregate.

Third qualifying round

Seeding
The third qualifying round was split into two separate sections: Champions Route (for league champions) and League Route (for league non-champions). The losing teams in both sections entered the 2016–17 UEFA Europa League play-off round.

A total of 30 teams played in the third qualifying round:
Champions Route: three teams which enter in this round, and the 17 winners of the second qualifying round.
League Route: ten teams which enter in this round.

The draw for the third qualifying round was held on 15 July 2016.

Notes

Summary
The first legs were played on 26 and 27 July, and the second legs were played on 2 and 3 August 2016.

|+Champions Route

|}

|+League Route

|}

Matches

APOEL won 4–2 on aggregate.

Dinamo Zagreb won 3–0 on aggregate.

Hapoel Be'er Sheva won 1–0 on aggregate.

Celtic won 3–2 on aggregate.

Legia Warsaw won 1–0 on aggregate.

1–1 on aggregate; Viktoria Plzeň won on away goals.

Copenhagen won 4–1 on aggregate.

Dundalk won 3–1 on aggregate.

Ludogorets Razgrad won 6–4 on aggregate.

Red Bull Salzburg won 3–0 on aggregate.

Ajax won 3–2 on aggregate.

Steaua București won 3–1 on aggregate.

2–2 on aggregate; Young Boys won on penalties.

Rostov won 4–2 on aggregate.

Monaco won 4–3 on aggregate.

Play-off round

Seeding
The play-off round was split into two separate sections: Champions Route (for league champions) and League Route (for league non-champions). The losing teams in both sections entered the 2016–17 UEFA Europa League group stage.

A total of 20 teams played in the play-off round:
Champions Route: the ten Champions Route winners of the third qualifying round.
League Route: five teams which entered in this round, and the five League Route winners of the third qualifying round.

The draw for the play-off round was held on 5 August 2016.

Summary
The first legs were played on 16 and 17 August, and the second legs were played on 23 and 24 August 2016.

|+Champions Route

|}

|+League Route

|}

Matches

Ludogorets Razgrad won 4–2 on aggregate.

Celtic won 5–4 on aggregate.

Copenhagen won 2–1 on aggregate.

Legia Warsaw won 3–1 on aggregate.

Dinamo Zagreb won 3–2 on aggregate.

Manchester City won 6–0 on aggregate.

Porto won 4–1 on aggregate.

Rostov won 5–2 on aggregate.

Borussia Mönchengladbach won 9–2 on aggregate.

Monaco won 3–1 on aggregate.

Statistics
There were 239 goals scored in 92 matches in the qualifying phase and play-off round, for an average of  goals per match.

Top goalscorers

Source:

Top assists

Source:

Notes

References

External links
2016–17 UEFA Champions League

Qualifying Rounds
2016-17
June 2016 sports events in Europe
July 2016 sports events in Europe
August 2016 sports events in Europe